The 1st Field Regiment, Royal New Zealand Artillery was a territorial field artillery regiment of the New Zealand Army. It was originally formed as 1st Field Artillery Brigade in 1921 and brought the independent batteries of the Auckland Area under a single command. In 1940, the New Zealand territorial artillery brigades were redesignated as regiments and the former batteries became troops within new, larger batteries During the Second World War, the 1st Field Regiment remained in New Zealand for home defense as part of the 1st Division. After the war, the regiment remained a part of the territorial force until it was disbanded in 1964.

Notes 

 Citations

 References

Artillery regiments of New Zealand
Military units and formations established in 1921
Military units and formations disestablished in 1964